The 1973 Charlotte Tennis Classic, also known by its sponsored name North Carolina National Bank Tennis Classic,  was a men's tennis tournament played on outdoor clay courts that was part of group B of the World Championship Tennis (WCT) circuit. It was the third edition of the tournament and was held from April 17 through April 22, 1973 at the Julian J. Clark Tennis Stadium on the grounds of the Olde Providence Racquet Club in Charlotte, North Carolina in the United States. First-seeded Ken Rosewall won his second successive singles title at the event and earned $10,000 first-prize money.

Finals

Singles
 Ken Rosewall defeated  Arthur Ashe 6–3, 7–6(7–1)

Doubles
 Tom Okker /  Marty Riessen defeated  Tom Gorman /  Erik van Dillen 7–6, 3–6, 6–3

References

External links
 ITF tournament edition details

Charlotte Tennis Classic
Charlotte Tennis Classic
Charlotte Tennis Classic
Charlotte Tennis Classic